The Pajama Game is a 1957 musical film based on the 1954 stage musical of the same name, itself based on the 1953 novel 7½ Cents by Richard Pike Bissell. The film was produced and directed by George Abbott and Stanley Donen, with most Broadway cast members repeating their roles in the movie with the notable exception of star Doris Day. The choreography is by Bob Fosse, who also staged the dances for the Broadway production.

Plot
Sid Sorokin has just been hired as superintendent of the Sleeptite Pajama Factory in Cedar Rapids, Iowa, where the union is pushing for a raise of seven-and-one-half cents per hour to bring them in line with the industry standard. The factory's owner, Mr. Hasler, thinks the raise is unnecessary. Sid soon falls for Babe Williams, a worker in the factory and member of the employee union's leadership. At the company picnic they become a couple, but Babe worries that their roles in management and labor will drive them apart, as the workers are planning a slow-down of work.  When Babe sabotages the machinery, Sid fires her, ending their relationship.

Meanwhile, the factory's time study man, "Hinesy", is unable to get over his suspicions that his girlfriend Gladys, Hasler's secretary, is unfaithful to him. Hoping to uncover Hasler's secrets, Sid takes Gladys on a date to the local hot spot, "Hernando's Hideaway." In her drunken state, Gladys lends him the key to the locked book. Sid discovers that Hasler reported the raise as having been instituted months ago and has been pocketing the difference himself. Sid threatens to send the book to the board of directors if the raise is not paid immediately.

At the union meeting that evening, amid talk of a strike, Sid arrives with Hasler, who announces he has agreed to the raise. When Babe realizes that it was Sid who engineered the raise and that he has only been attempting to avert labor strife, she returns to him. Some time later, the employees of Sleeptite put on a fashion show, with Babe and Sid, now married, sharing a single set of pajamas.

Cast
Doris Day as Katherine "Babe" Williams 
John Raitt as Sid Sorokin
Carol Haney as Gladys Hotchkiss
Eddie Foy Jr. as Vernon "Hinesy" Hines
Reta Shaw as Mabel
Thelma Pelish as Mae
Jack Straw as Prez
Barbara Nichols as "Poopsie"
Ralph Dunn as Myron Hasler
Owen Martin as Max
Ralph Chambers as Charlie
Mary Stanton as Brenda
Kenneth LeRoy and Buzz Miller dance "Steam Heat"

Production
The principal cast of the Broadway musical repeated their roles for the movie, with the exception of Janis Paige, whose role is played by Doris Day; and Stanley Prager, whose role is played by Jack Straw. 

As recounted in 2016 by Paige, the studio desired to use as many members of the Broadway cast as possible. But one of the leads had to be a movie star. She said that the male lead, played by Raitt, was originally offered to Frank Sinatra. Had he accepted the role, Paige said, she would have played the part that was given to Doris Day.

In this film, the calendar behind Sid Sorokin's desk while he sings "Hey There" shows July 1954.

Songs
 "The Pajama Game" – Ensemble
 "Racing With the Clock" – Ensemble
 "I'm Not At All In Love" – Babe and Ensemble
 "I'll Never Be Jealous Again" – Hines and Mabel
 "Hey There" – Sid
 "Once-A-Year-Day" – Babe, Sid, and Ensemble
 "Small Talk" – Babe and Sid
 "There Once Was a Man" – Babe and Sid
 "Racing With the Clock" (reprise) – Ensemble
 "Steam Heat" – Gladys
 "Hey There" (reprise) – Babe
 "Hernando's Hideaway" – Gladys and Ensemble
 "7½ Cents" – Babe, Prez, and Ensemble

Reception
The film has a 91% rating on Rotten Tomatoes.

At the time of its release, it received a favorable review by Bosley Crowther of The New York Times. He compared the film favorably to the Broadway stage version, and said the film is "as good as it was on the stage, which was quite good enough for many thousand happy customers over a period of a couple of years. It is fresh, funny, lively and tuneful. Indeed, in certain respects—such as when they all go on the factory picnic—it is even more lively than it was on the stage."

The film is recognized by American Film Institute in these lists:
 2004: AFI's 100 Years...100 Songs:
 "Hey There" – Nominated
 2006: AFI's Greatest Movie Musicals – Nominated

See also
 List of American films of 1957
 The Pajama Game (album)

References

External links
 
 

1957 films
1957 musical films
American musical films
Films based on musicals
Films set in Iowa
Warner Bros. films
Films directed by George Abbott
Films directed by Stanley Donen
Films based on adaptations
1950s English-language films
1950s American films